UFC Fight Night: Covington vs. Woodley  (also known as UFC Fight Night 178, UFC on ESPN+ 36 and UFC Vegas 11) was a mixed martial arts event produced by the Ultimate Fighting Championship that took place on September 19, 2020 at the UFC Apex facility in Enterprise, Nevada, part of the Las Vegas Metropolitan Area, United States.

Background 
The event was originally expected to take place on September 26, but it was moved up a week. UFC 253 took place on the former date.

UFC officials had initially targeted a welterweight bout between former UFC Welterweight Champion Tyron Woodley and former interim champion Colby Covington to serve as the event headliner for UFC on ESPN: Munhoz vs. Edgar, but Woodley announced that the date did not provide him with time suitable enough to prepare because of injuries incurred during his most recent fight. The pairing headlined this event.

A heavyweight bout between Ciryl Gane and Shamil Abdurakhimov was expected to take place at this event. The pairing was originally scheduled for UFC 249, but Gane was forced to pull out of the event after he was struck by a pneumothorax in training. Subsequently, the pairing was rescheduled for UFC 251 and cancelled a second time as Abdurakhimov was removed from the bout for undisclosed reasons. They were later rebooked for UFC 253, before eventually having the bout shifted to this event. In turn, the bout then shifted again for undisclosed reasons and was expected to take place four weeks later at UFC Fight Night: Ortega vs. The Korean Zombie.

A flyweight bout between Jordan Espinosa and David Dvořák was expected to take place at UFC 253, but was later rebooked for this event due to undisclosed reasons.

A welterweight bout between Mickey Gall and Miguel Baeza was scheduled for the event. However, Gall pulled out on September 11 due to an injury. He was replaced by Jeremiah Wells. On September 17, it was announced that the bout was cancelled due to undisclosed reasons.

A featherweight bout between Mirsad Bektić and Luiz Eduardo Garagorri was scheduled for the event. However, Garagorri was pulled from the fight on September 15 after a cornerman of his tested positive for COVID-19. Bektić faced returning veteran Damon Jackson.

Results

Bonus awards
The following fighters received $50,000 bonuses.
Fight of the Night: No bonus awarded.
Performance of the Night: Khamzat Chimaev, Mackenzie Dern, Damon Jackson and Randy Costa

Aftermath
On November 4, it was announced that the Nevada State Athletic Commission (NSAC) issued a temporary suspension for Niko Price, after he tested positive for carboxy THC in a drug test related to his fight. A month later,  On November 4, Price was officially suspended for six months retroactive to the date of the fight, with the result of the bout being overturned to a no contest due to the violation. He was fined $8,500 and before he is re-licensed in Las Vegas, Price will also have to pay a prosecution fee of $145.36.

See also

 List of UFC events
 List of current UFC fighters
 2020 in UFC

References

UFC Fight Night
2020 in mixed martial arts
2020 in sports in Nevada
Mixed martial arts in Las Vegas
Sports competitions in Las Vegas
September 2020 sports events in the United States